Nikolay Mikhaylov may refer to:

 Nikolay Mikhaylov (ice hockey) (born 1948), Bulgarian ice hockey player
 Nikolay Mikhaylov (conductor) (1932–2006), Soviet military conductor
 Nikolai Mikhailov (politician) (1906–1982), Russian Soviet politician, journalist and diplomat